Thandai is an Indian cold drink prepared with a mixture of almonds, fennel seeds, watermelon kernels, rose petals, pepper, poppy seeds, Fennel Seeds  cardamom, saffron, milk and sugar. It is native to India and is often associated with the Maha Shivaratri and Holi or Holla mahalla  festival. It is most commonly consumed in north India. There are variants of thandai and the most common are badam (almond) thandai and bhang (cannabis) thandai.

Variations 
Though thandai refers to a traditional festival drink made with various spices and nuts, this versatile drink can also be prepared in many different ways.

References

Indian drinks
Cannabis and Hinduism